Stamnaria is a genus of fungi in the family Helotiaceae.  The genus contains at least 7 species, all of which are parasites of horsetails, reproducing through apothecia which burst through the outer surface of the hosts.  It has an anamorph (asexual stage) with genus name Titaeospora, but according to current rules the holomorph name Stamnaria should be used where possible.

Species
As acceped by Species Fungorum;
 Stamnaria americana 
 Stamnaria herjedalensis 
 Stamnaria hyalopus 
 Stamnaria persoonii  (
 Stamnaria pusio 
 Stamnaria thujae 
 Stamnaria yugrana

References

Helotiaceae